Malekabad (also Romanized as Malekābād) is a village in Takab Rural District, Shahdad District, Kerman County, Kerman Province, Iran. At the 2006 census, its population was 99, in 24 families.

References 

Populated places in Kerman County